Hat is an album by British musician Davy Graham, released in 1969.

Reception

In his Allmusic review, critic Ritchie Unterberger wrote, "There's no such thing as a bad Graham album from the 1960s. While Hat isn't necessarily the first one you should dig into, it offers the standard pleasures that you expect from his records: excellent, feverishly imaginative acoustic guitar playing..."

Track listing
"Getting Better" (John Lennon, Paul McCartney) – 2:03
"Lotus Blossom" (Sam Coslow, Arthur Johnston) – 2:29
"I'm Ready" (Willie Dixon) – 2:32
"Buhaina Chant" (Art Blakey) – 2:34
"Homeward Bound" (Paul Simon) – 2:21
"Love Is Pleasing" (Traditional) – 2:16
"Hornpipe for Harpsichord, Played Upon Guitar" (Henry Purcell) – 1:31
"Down Along the Cove" (Bob Dylan) – 2:13
"Hoochie Coochie Man" (Willie Dixon) – 3:38
"Stan's Guitar" (Stanley Albert Watson) – 2:23
"Pretty Polly" (Traditional) – 3:26
"Bulgarian Dance" (Traditional) – 3:21
"I Am a Rock" (Paul Simon) – 2:20
"Oliver" (Oliver Hunt) – 1:37

Personnel
Davy Graham – vocals, guitar
Danny Thompson – bass
Technical
Terry Johnson - engineer

References 

1969 albums
Davey Graham albums
Decca Records albums